General Wolfe Elementary is a public elementary school in Vancouver, British Columbia part of School District 39 Vancouver.

History 
General Wolfe Elementary was built in 1910.  One of Wolfe's claims to fame is the boy in "Wait for Me, Daddy" photograph (of a boy reaching out towards his father in a line for war). This photo is internationally recognized, and the boy went to school at Wolfe. In 1912, two additional wings were added due to expanding population.  Then in 1920 two wooden temporary buildings were built.  These two buildings are still the annex and the gym today. General Wolfe used to have three portables which were used as classrooms, but when attendance dropped some in 2007, they were all eventually taken away. General Wolfe Elementary was named after General James Wolfe.

Traditionally, the school holds an annual "Walk-A-Thon", in which students walk or jog laps around the school to receive prizes, to raise funds. In the 2005-2006 school year, this was canceled for an unknown reason.

General Wolfe also sells magazines for fundraising at the beginning of each year. The Student Council and the PAC (Parent Advisory Council) come up with more fundraisers each year, and what to buy with the money produced.

Code of Conduct 

PAWS is the schools code of conduct.
P - Polite
A - Accountable
W - Welcoming
S - Safe

Sports Teams and Other Clubs 

General Wolfe has 8 sports programs available, a Junior and Senior Volleyball team, a Junior and Senior Basketball team, Floor Hockey, Badminton and Ultimate Frisbee. General Wolfe also supports a chess club, Junior and Senior choirs, Pop Music Club, and a drama club for the younger students.

References

External links 
http://www.vsb.bc.ca/schools/Elementaryschools/03939045/Profile/default.htm
http://wolfe.vsb.bc.ca
http://www.generalwolfepac.ca

Elementary schools in Vancouver